Elkhart is a city in and the county seat of Morton County, Kansas, United States. As of the 2020 census, the population of the city was 1,888.

History

Elkhart was founded in 1913, and was named after Elkhart, Indiana.

Elkhart was the starting point of the Elkhart and Santa Fe Railway.  This line, both leased to and a wholly owned subsidiary of the Atchison, Topeka and Santa Fe Railway, was built in 1925 to Felt, Oklahoma, and extended into New Mexico in 1932; but, was abandoned in 1942.  

In 1961, the county seat was moved from Richfield to Elkhart.

Geography

Climate
Elkhart has a cool semi-arid climate (Köppen BSk) characterized by generally dry winters with extreme temperature variations, and hot summers with occasional heavy precipitation from thunder showers or storms.

During winter, because western Kansas lies both on the edge of the subtropical anticyclones and in the rain shadow of westerly winds crossing the Rocky Mountains, the region is generally dry: no measurable precipitation fell in Elkhart between 25 December 1903 and 2 April 1904, while monthly precipitation above  has never been recorded during January and is observed fewer than one year in ten during November, December or February. Temperatures can vary greatly during this season: strong chinook winds can drive temperatures above  even in the depth of winter, with  reached on average during six days between December and February, seven during November and eight during March. Nevertheless, cold outbreaks from Canada drive temperatures to or below  on an average of 3.6 nights per winter. The coldest temperature recorded in Elkhart has been  on January 19, 1984, while the hottest winter temperature has been  on February 1, 1963.

In contrast, only a trace of snow was recorded between July 1949 and January 1950.

Demographics

2010 census
As of the census of 2010, there were 2,205 people, 856 households, and 571 families residing in the city. The racial makeup of the city was 87.7% White, 0.1% African American, 1.2% Native American, 2.5% Asian, 6.8% from other races, and 1.6% from two or more races. Hispanic or Latino of any race were 20.7% of the population.

There were 856 households, of which 33.8% had children under the age of 18 living with them, 52.9% were married couples living together, 9.1% had a female householder with no husband present, 4.7% had a male householder with no wife present, and 33.3% were non-families. 29.2% of all households were made up of individuals, and 14.6% had someone living alone who was 65 years of age or older. The average household size was 2.48 and the average family size was 3.07.

The median age in the city was 38.4 years. 26.4% of residents were under the age of 18; 7.6% were between the ages of 18 and 24; 23% were from 25 to 44; 25.6% were from 45 to 64; and 17.6% were 65 years of age or older. The gender makeup of the city was 47.7% male and 52.3% female.

2000 census
As of the census of 2000, there were 2,233 people, 854 households, and 610 families residing in the city. The racial makeup of the city was 89.34% White, 0.09% African American, 1.16% Native American, 1.25% Asian, 6.63% from other races, and 1.52% from two or more races. Hispanic or Latino of any race were 13.39% of the population.

There were 854 households, out of which 36.2% had children under the age of 18 living with them, 61.9% were married couples living together, 7.4% had a female householder with no husband present, and 28.5% were non-families. 26.1% of all households were made up of individuals, and 10.4% had someone living alone who was 65 years of age or older. The average household size was 2.55 and the average family size was 3.08.

In the city, the population was spread out, with 28.0% under the age of 18, 9.0% from 18 to 24, 27.4% from 25 to 44, 20.8% from 45 to 64, and 14.8% who were 65 years of age or older. The median age was 36 years. For every 100 females, there were 91.8 males. For every 100 females age 18 and over, there were 88.2 males.

The median income for a household in the city was $37,333, and the median income for a family was $43,548. Males had a median income of $33,333 versus $19,792 for females. The per capita income for the city was $17,900. About 7.3% of families and 9.3% of the population were below the poverty line, including 13.8% of those under age 18 and 4.7% of those age 65 or over.

Education
Elkhart is served by USD 218 Elkhart. The Elkhart High School mascot is Wildcats.

Area attractions

 Cimarron National Grassland

Elkhart is home to multiple locations relevant to the Santa Fe Trail, including
 Point of Rocks--Middle Spring Santa Fe Trail Historic District, 2.5 miles (4.0 km) south of K-51 and 2 miles (3.2 km) west of K-27
 Santa Fe Trail--Cimarron National Grassland Segment 1,  2.0 miles (3.2 km) south of K-51 at the Colorado–Kansas state line
 Santa Fe Trail--Cimarron National Grassland Segment 2,  1.66 miles (2.67 km) south of K-51 and 1 mile (1.6 km) east of County Road 2
 Santa Fe Trail--Cimarron National Grassland Segment 3,  FSR-600, east and west sides of k-27
 Santa Fe Trail--Cimarron National Grassland Segment 4,  2.5 miles (4.0 km) east of K-27, north of FSR-600
 Santa Fe Trail--Cimarron National Grassland Segment 5

Notable people
 Sanora Babb, writer.
 Walter Baker, sprinter, 2-time Olympic medalist (1952 and 1956).
 Glenn Cunningham, long distance runner, used to hold 1-mile world record, Olympic silver medalist 1936.
 Robelyn Garcia, former professional basketball player.
 Jerry Simmons, NFL strength and conditioning coach for 23 years, father of Jordon, uncle of Darrin.
 Darrin Simmons, football coach, special teams for the Cincinnati Bengals.

See also
 Elkhart–Morton County Airport
 High Plains Public Radio

References

Further reading

External links

 City of Elkhart
 Elkhart - Directory of Public Officials
 USD 218, local school district
 Morton County Historical Society Museum
 Elkhart city map, KDOT

Cities in Kansas
County seats in Kansas
Cities in Morton County, Kansas
1913 establishments in Kansas